Young and Crazy may refer to:

"Young and Crazy" an album by Tigertailz
"Young and Crazy", instrumental from Motörhead album Iron Fist 1982
"Young & Crazy", song by Frankie Ballard
"Young and Crazy", single 1980 by Nikki & the Corvettes from Nikki & the Corvettes